Latinos Football Club is a Cayman Islands football club based in George Town, which currently play in the Cayman Islands Premier League. The club plays home matches at the Annex Stadium in George Town. For the 2017/2018 Season both the CIFA Fosters First Division teams and the Cayman Islands Premier League teams will compete in one combined league with matches starting on October 14, 2017.

Latinos FC had their first major success in 2003/04 when they won both the Cayman Islands Premier League and the Cayman Islands FA Cup. The team then won the Cayman Islands FA Cup in the 2006/07 season which ended up being their last major success up until the 2015/16 season. In 2008/09 season, despite finishing only 5th in the Cayman Islands Premier League, the team disbanded and dropped to the CIFA Fosters First Division for the start of the 2009/10 league season. Since then and after years of being in the CIFA Fosters First Division, Latinos FC won the 2015/16 season to be promoted once again to the Cayman Islands Premier League. During the 2015/16 season Latinos won their first round FA Cup match versus Academy SC; however, Academy SC went through to the quarter-finals of the FA Cup due to an ineligible substitute not named on the sign-in sheet at the commencement of the match. Latinos were forced to settle with only a chance at the First Division.

Achievements
CIFA Fosters First Division: 1
 2015/16

Cayman Islands Premier League: 1
 2003/04

Cayman Islands FA Cup: 2
 2003/04, 2006/07

Coaching staff

Players

First team squad

Matches

Cayman Islands Premier League 2016-17|

Notable Matches:

Latinos FC [2] v Scholars International SC [2]
Academy SC [2] v Latinos FC [3]
Latinos FC [5] v Sunset FC [3]

References

Football clubs in the Cayman Islands
Association football clubs established in 1982
1982 establishments in the Cayman Islands